County Route 520 (CR 520) is a county highway in the U.S. state of New Jersey. County Route 520 is a major road across Monmouth County connecting the county's central towns to the Jersey Shore at Sea Bright. The highway extends  from Englishtown Road (CR 527) in Old Bridge Township to Ocean Avenue (Route 36, formerly County Route 9) in Sea Bright.

CR 520 extends east along Texas Road to the intersection with Marlboro Road, then turns southeast onto Marlboro Road. Texas Road continues beyond Marlboro Road as CR 690. CR 520 is under municipal (Old Bridge and Marlboro Townships) jurisdiction between Texas Road and U.S. Route 9 (US 9). From US 9 to its eastern terminus it is under Monmouth County jurisdiction. CR 520 is known by several names between US 9 and Route 35, among them Main Street, Newman Springs Road and simply Route 520, but for the greater part of its distance it is Newman Springs Road. At Route 35, CR 520 turns briefly north on Broad Street in Red Bank, then turns east again onto Pinckney Road, which it follows into Little Silver. It continues through Little Silver along Branch Avenue before turning onto Rumson Road, which it then follows through Rumson to its terminus at Ocean Avenue (Route 36) in Sea Bright.

Route description

CR 520 begins at an intersection with CR 527 in Old Bridge Township, Middlesex County, heading east on two-lane undivided Texas Road. The route heads through dense forests before it comes to a junction with CR 690. At this point, CR 690 continues east along Texas Road and CR 520 heads southeast on Marlboro Road. The road passes near a housing development and crosses into Marlboro Township in Monmouth County, where it widens to four lanes as it crosses US 9 in an area of businesses. Past this intersection, the route narrows back to two lanes and passes through wooded residential areas before it crosses CR 3 and comes to a partial interchange with the Route 18 freeway; missing movements are provided by CR 3. Following this, CR 520 continues past more housing developments and curves to the east, becoming Newman Springs Road. The road crosses Route 79 and runs through a mix of fields and woods with some homes, heading to the east-northeast. The route becomes the border between Marlboro Township to the north and Colts Neck Township to the south as it heads more to the east.

CR 520 crosses Willow Brook into Holmdel Township shortly before it reaches an intersection with Route 34. After this junction, the road passes between a corporate park to the north and fields to the south before it crosses CR 4 and runs past residential neighborhoods. The route passes to the north of Thompson County Park and enters Middletown Township at the CR 52 intersection. CR 520 curves southeast and heads east to a roundabout at the entrance road to Brookdale Community College. Farther east, the route intersects CR 50 in a commercial area, at which point it widens to four lanes. The road heads past homes and crosses under Normandy Road and a railroad line which link the two sections of Naval Weapons Station Earle, where it briefly becomes a divided highway. A short distance later, CR 520 comes to an interchange with the Garden State Parkway. At this interchange, park and ride lots are located at the northwest and northeast corners, with the lot on the northeast corner called the Lincroft Transportation Center Park & Ride and serving Academy Bus Lines. Following this, the route becomes a divided highway again and runs past a few businesses before it crosses the Swimming River and becomes the border between Red Bank to the north and Tinton Falls to the south. The road becomes undivided again as it passes homes. Upon crossing CR 13, CR 520 narrows to two lanes and passes businesses as it separates Red Bank to the north and Shrewsbury to the south. The road crosses the Southern Secondary railroad line operated by the Delaware and Raritan River Railroad and continues east to an intersection with Route 35.

At this point, CR 520 turns north for a brief concurrency with Route 35, crossing NJ Transit's North Jersey Coast Line. Immediately after the railroad tracks, Route 35 splits to the northwest and CR 520 continues north on two-lane Broad Street for one block before it turns east onto Pinckney Road, with CR 11 continuing north on Broad Street. CR 520 runs through wooded residential areas and leaves Red Bank for Little Silver. At an intersection with another segment of CR 11, the route turns southeast onto Branch Avenue. CR 520 turns northeast onto Rumson Road and CR 11 continues along Branch Avenue. The road passes more homes and continues into Rumson. CR 520 continues northeast and passes to the north of Rumson Country Club. Farther east, the route curves to the east and crosses the Shrewsbury River on a drawbridge into Sea Bright. Immediately after the bridge, CR 520 reaches its eastern terminus at an intersection with Route 36 near the Atlantic Ocean.

Major intersections

See also

References

External links

NJ State Highways: CR 515-530

520
520
520